The following lists events that happened during 1802 in Australia.

Incumbents
Monarch - George III

Governors
Governors of the Australian colonies:
Governor of New South Wales – Captain Philip King

Events
 8 April – Matthew Flinders meets the French explorer Nicolas Baudin at Encounter Bay.
 2 June – Pemulwuy is shot and killed following the killing of four white men at Parramatta and Toongabbie.
 9 October - The first book printed in Australia appeared. It was an abridged version of the New South Wales General Standing Orders. Its publication was supervised by the government printer, George Howe.

Exploration and settlement
14 February – Acting lieutenant John Murray, commander of the Lady Nelson, explores Port Phillip.
1 May – Matthew Flinders becomes the first European to visit the You Yangs ranges near Geelong, Victoria. He and three of his men climb to the highest point, naming it "Station Peak". It is later renamed Flinders Peak.

Deaths
2 June – Pemulwuy (b. c. 1750), Indigenous Australian resistance leader
2 June - Thomas Fyshe Palmer, Unitarian minister, political reformer and convict.
12 June – Peter Good, English gardener on Matthew Flinders' voyage

References

 
Years of the 19th century in Australia